Nong Mamong is the northwesternmost district (amphoe) of Chai Nat province, central Thailand.

Geography
Neighboring districts are (from the east clockwise) Wat Sing and Hankha of Chainat Province, Ban Rai, Huai Khot, Nong Chang and Nong Khayang of Uthai Thani province.

History
The minor district (king amphoe) was established on 15 July 1996 with four tambons split off from Wat Sing district.

On 15 May 2007, all 81 minor districts were upgraded to full districts. With publication in the Royal Gazette on 24 August the upgrade became official.

Administration
The district is divided into four sub-districts (tambons), which are further subdivided into 42 villages (mubans). There are no municipal (thesaban) areas, and a further four tambon administrative organizations (TAO).

References

External links
amphoe.com

Nong Mamong